Laura Steinbach-Romero (born 2 August 1985) is a former German handball player for the German national team. Since summer of 2016 she is married with former Spanish handball player Iker Romero.

Career
She represented Germany at the 2008 Summer Olympic Games in Beijing, where Germany placed 11th. She participates at the 2009 World Women's Handball Championship in China.

In 2013, she was transferred from Bayer Leverkusen to Ferencváros Budapest.

References

1985 births
Living people
German female handball players
People from Homburg, Saarland
Handball players at the 2008 Summer Olympics
Olympic handball players of Germany
Expatriate handball players
German expatriate sportspeople in Hungary
German expatriate sportspeople in Spain
Sportspeople from Saarland